Nicolette may refer to:

People

Given name
 Nicolette (musician) (born 1964), a UK singer/songwriter of Nigerian parentage
 Nicolette Bethel, Bahamian teacher, writer and anthropologist
 Nicolette Fernandes (born 1983), Guyanese squash player
 Nicolette Hellemans (born 1961), former international rower from the Netherlands
 Nicolette Jennings (born 1996), American model, beauty pageant titleholder, Miss Florida USA 2019, and Top 10 Miss USA 2019
 Nicolette Krebitz (born 1972), German actress
 Nicolette Larson (1952–1997), American singer
 Nicolette Palikat (born 1985), Malaysian singer from Tambunan, Sabah
 Nicollette Sheridan (born 1963), British actress

Surname
 Mike Nicolette, American professional golfer

Other uses
 Nicolette (album), a 1978 album release by Nicolette Larson
 Nicolette (novel), a 1922 novel by Baroness Orczy
 Nicolette, West Virginia, a community in the United States
 Nicolette Grant, a character on the HBO series Big Love

See also
 Aucassin and Nicolette, a medieval French chantefable
 DJ-Kicks: Nicolette, a DJ mix album
 Nicollet (disambiguation)